WIBB may refer to:

 Sultan Syarif Kasim II Airport, in Pekanbaru, Riau
 WIBB-FM, a radio station at 97.9 FM licensed to Fort Valley, Georgia
 WIHB (AM), a radio station (1280 AM) licensed to serve Macon, Georgia, which held the call sign WIBB several times
 Wireless Broadband